Grand Prince Yangnyeong (Hangul: 양녕대군, Hanja: 讓寧大君, 1394–1462) was a former Crown Prince of the Joseon Dynasty of Korea. He was the first son and fourth child of King Taejong and his wife, Queen Wongyeong. Yangnyeong was the elder brother of Sejong the Great, and an ancestor of Syngman Rhee, an independence activist and the first President of South Korea.

Biography
He was born as Yi Je (Hangul: 이제, Hanja: 李禔) in 1394. Originally his father appointed him as the Crown Prince but he eventually executed Queen Wongyeong's brothers and in the 18th year of his reign replaced prince Yangnyeong with his third son prince Chungnyeong as his successor. Known for his literature and calligraphy skills, the former Crown Prince viewed himself as lacking in the requisite skills for kingship and believed that Sejong was destined to become king. 

Considering it his duty to make Sejong king, he purposely acted extremely rude in court. On May 1415, he caused a scandal when he had an affair with Chogungjang, the kisaeng of his uncle and former king, Jeongjong. Yangnyeong was unaware that Chogungjang was his uncle's woman. On 15 February 1417, Yangnyeong secretly brought in Eori, the concubine of Gwak Seon, into the palace. She later became pregnant with the crown prince's child. Due to Yangnyeong's behavior, King Taejong dethroned Crown Prince Yangnyeong from the role of the crown prince on 3 June 1418. Grand Prince Hyoryeong, Yangnyeong's second brother, had similar feelings about Chungyeong being king, and so he became a monk in a Buddhist temple. It is possible that King Taejong’s willingness to execute troublesome family members helped to encourage his first two sons to step aside, allowing King Taejong's third and favorite son to become King Sejong. This plot ultimately brought Sejong to the throne. Later, Yangnyeong became a wandering traveler and lived in the mountains.

After Sejong had taken the throne, the relationship between the brothers became strong, and Sejong often invited Yangnyeong to the palace.

Yangnyeong lived as a wanderer and died in 1462, almost living for 68 years.

The tomb of Prince Yangneong was reopened in 2018 to the public after 18 years of closure.

Family
Father: King Taejong of Joseon (조선 태종) (13 June 1367 - 30 May 1422)
 Grandfather: King Taejo of Joseon (조선 태조) (27 October 1335 - 18 June 1408)
 Grandmother: Queen Shinui of the Anbyeon Han clan (신의왕후 한씨) (1337 - 21 October 1391)
Mother: Queen Wongyeong of the Yeoheung Min clan (원경왕후 민씨) (29 July 1365 - 18 August 1420)
 Grandfather: Min Je (민제, 閔霽) (1339 - 1408)
 Grandmother: Lady Song of the Yeosan Song clan (여산 송씨, 礪山 宋氏) (1342 - 1424)
Consorts and their respective issue:
 Princess Consort Suseong of the Gwangsan Kim clan (수성군부인 김씨)
 Princess Jaeryeong (재령군주) or Princess Jeonui (전의현주) (1409 - 1444)
 Yi Gae, Prince Sunseong (이개 순성군) (? - 2 September 1462)
 Princess Yangcheon (영천군주) (1412 - 5 April 1442)
 Yi Po, Prince Hamyang (이포 함양군) (1417 - 21 June 1475)
 Yi Hye, Prince Seosan (이혜 서산군) (? - 10 April 1451)
 Princess Yi of the Jeonju Yi clan (현주 이씨)
 Princess Yeongpyeong (영평현주)
 Princess Yi of the Jeonju Yi clan (현주 이씨)
 Kisaeng Bong Ji-ryeon (기생 봉지련)
 Unknown concubine 
 Yi Gyeom (이겸)
 Yi Heun (이흔)
 Yi Seong (이성)
 Yi Sun (이순)
 Yi Sim (이심)
 Yi Gwang-seok (이광석)
 Yi Gwang-geun (이광근)
 Kisaeng Eori (기생 어리)
 Princess Yi of the Jeonju Yi clan (현주 이씨)
 Kisaeng Chogungjang (초궁장)
 Kisaeng Jeonghyang (기생 정향)
 Kisaeng Chil Jeom-saeng (기생 칠점생)
 Unknown concubine 
 Lady Yi
 Lady Yi
 Lady Yi
 Lady Yi
 Lady Yi
 Unknown slave
 Lady Yi
 Princess Yi Gu-ji (현주 이구지)
 Unknown concubine 
 Lady Yi
 Lady Yi
 Lady Yi
 Princess Yi Geon-yi (현주 이건이)

Popular culture
 Portrayed by Song Ki-yoon in the 1983 MBC TV series The King of Chudong Palace.
 Portrayed by Lee Min-woo in the 1996-1998 KBS1 TV series Tears of the Dragon.
 Portrayed by Park Sang-min, Jung Chan-woo and Lee In in the 2008 KBS2 TV series King Sejong the Great.
 Portrayed by Park Woong in the 2011 JTBC TV series Insu, The Queen Mother. 
 Portrayed by Baek Do-bin in the 2012 film I Am the King.
 Portrayed by Lee Byung-wook in the 2016 KBS1 TV series Jang Yeong-sil.
 Portrayed by Lee Tae-ri, Kim Joon-ui and Kim In-woo in the 2021-2022 KBS1 TV series The King of Tears, Lee Bang-won.

Trivia
Today, his descendants form one of the biggest branches of the House of Yi. In addition, it is believed that the plaque on the Namdaemun Gate was personally written by him.

He was an ancestor of Syngman Rhee, an independence activist and the first South Korean president.

References

External links
 Prince Yangnyeong:Korean historical person information  
 왕위 버리고 자유 택하다 오마이뉴스 2006.09.15 
 Prince Yangnyeong:Navercast 
 Prince Yangnyeong

References
 Kim Haboush, JaHyun and Martina Deuchler (1999). Culture and the State in Late Chosŏn Korea.  Cambridge: Harvard University Press. ;  OCLC 40926015
 Lee, Peter H. (1993). Sourcebook of Korean Civilization, Vol.  1. New York: Columbia University Press. ; ; ;  OCLC 26353271
 Lee Bae-yong (2008). Women in Korean History. Seoul: Ewha Womans University Press.  

1394 births
1468 deaths
15th-century Korean poets
Korean princes
Korean Confucianists
15th-century Korean philosophers
House of Yi
Joseon dynasty
15th-century Korean calligraphers
Heirs apparent who never acceded